Brigham may refer to:

Places
 Brigham, Cumbria, England
 Brigham, East Riding of Yorkshire, England
 Brigham City, Utah, USA
 Brigham, Wisconsin, USA
 Brigham, Quebec, Canada

People
 Brigham (surname), including a list of people with the surname
 Brigham Young (1801–1877), second prophet and president of The Church of Jesus Christ of Latter-day Saints
 Brigham Young Jr. (1836–1903), American Mormon missionary and leader in the LDS Church, a son of Brigham Young
Brigham Morris Young (1854–1931), Mormon missionary and entertainer, another son of Brigham Young
 Brigham D. Madsen (1914–2010), American historian
 Brigham McCown (born 1966), American entrepreneur and former government official
 Brigham Smoot (1869–1946), American Mormon missionary and businessman

Institutions
 Brigham and Women's Hospital, a Harvard University affiliated teaching and research institution in Boston, Massachusetts
 Brigham Young University (BYU), in Provo, Utah, USA
 Brigham Young University–Idaho (BYU-Idaho or BYU-I)
 Brigham Young University–Hawaii
 Brigham Young College, Logan, Utah, USA

Other uses
 HMS Brigham (M2613), a 1953 Ham class in-shore minesweeper
 Brigham (film), a 1977 American film
 Mercedes Brigham, a character in the Honorverse books by David Weber